Chestnut Hill is an unincorporated community in Ashe County, North Carolina, United States, located south of Crumpler. It lies at an elevation of 2,756 feet (840 m).

References

Unincorporated communities in Ashe County, North Carolina
Unincorporated communities in North Carolina